Vinay Kumar Sorake is an Indian politician of Indian National Congress. He represented the Udupi (Lok Sabha constituency) in Thirteenth  Lok Sabha  He is also the secretary of All India Congress Committee.

References

People from Karnataka
People from Udupi
India MPs 1999–2004
Indian National Congress politicians
Indian National Congress politicians from Karnataka